Stephanie Jutta Schwabe ( in Germany) is a geomicrobiologist. She completed a Ph.D. in the biogeochemical investigation of caves within the Bahamian carbonate platforms, commonly referred to as blue holes. She is an expert geologic diver mostly in Bahamian blues holes, though her experience extends to expeditions in U.S. waters. Diver International named her one of the top 40 divers in the world. She earned a degree in law with a focus on  international environmental law.

Schwabe is a fellow of the Royal Geographical Society of London. She was named a NASA fellow in exo-biology for her discovery of a unique life system found only in the black fresh water holes in the Bahamas, and was featured in the book titled Women of Discovery: A Celebration of Intrepid Women Who Explored the World.

In 2004, Schwabe was given the Women of Discovery Award for Courage by Wings WorldQuest.

Exploration
Schwabe began diving in caves in 1992. Since that time, she has participated in eighteen scientific expeditions to the Bahamas, as subjects for masters and doctoral research.  She has participated in a number of film expeditions. In 1999, Schwabe's discovery quest led her to the Black Hole of Andros, Bahamas.

Schwabe discovered a species of purple sulfur bacteria she named Allocromatium palmerii in 2003 after her late husband and diver Rob Palmer.

Schwabe is the founder and director of the Rob Palmer Blues Holes Foundation, a nonprofit organization. The foundation is dedicated to the scientific and physical exploration of blue holes within the Bahamas and related environment. The foundation's goals are to encourage education and conservation of Bahamian caves and blue holes.

Third Man phenomenon

Schwabe also describes the Third Man phenomenon that occurred to her while lost as she was solo diving in a cave.
Her husband, British diving pioneer Rob Palmer, died on a pleasure dive in the Red Sea in 1997.

References

Bibliography
Stephanie Schwabe and James L. Carew.  "Blue Holes:  An Inappropriate Moniker for Scientific Discussion of Water-Filled Caves in the Bahamas" (Accessed 3/8/06)
Schwabe, S. J. ,and Herbert, R., 2004, Black Holes of the Bahamas: What they are and why they are black: Quaternary International, v. 121, p. 3-11.
Schwabe, Stephanie. Blue Holes of the Bahamas: A Silent Death Immersed Summer 2001/vol 6, No.2

External links
 The Robert Palmer Blue Holes Foundation
Explorers Journal Conversation

German women biologists
Geomicrobiologists
German marine biologists
1957 births
Living people
Cavers
Underwater divers
German women geologists
20th-century German geologists